Tadashi Tokieda (Japanese: 時枝正; born 1968) is a Japanese mathematician, working in mathematical physics. He is a professor of mathematics at Stanford University; previously he was the Director of Studies in Mathematics at Trinity Hall, Cambridge. He is also very active in inventing, collecting, and studying toys that uniquely reveal and explore real-world surprises of mathematics and physics. In comparison with most mathematicians, he had an unusual path in life: he started as a painter, and then became a classical philologist, before switching to mathematics.

Life and career
Tokieda was born in Tokyo and grew up to be a painter.

He then studied at Lycée Sainte-Marie Grand Lebrun in France as a classical philologist. According to his personal homepage, he taught himself basic mathematics from Russian collections of problems.

He is a 1989 classics graduate from Sophia University in Tokyo and has a 1991 bachelor's degree from Oxford in mathematics (where he studied as a British Council Fellow). He obtained his PhD at Princeton under the supervision of William Browder.

Tokieda joined the University of Illinois at Urbana Champaign as a J. L. Doob Research Assistant Professor for the 1997 academic year.

He has been involved in the African Institute for Mathematical Sciences since its beginning in 2003.

In 2004, he was elected a Fellow of Trinity Hall, where he became the Director of Studies in Mathematics and the Stephan and Thomas Körner Fellow.

He was the William and Flora Hewlett Foundation Fellow in 2013–2014 at the Radcliffe Institute for Advanced Study at Harvard University.

In the academic year 2015–2016 he was the Poincaré Distinguished Visiting Professor at Stanford.

Besides his native language Japanese, he is also fluent in French and English. In addition, he knows ancient Greek, Latin, classical Chinese, Finnish, Spanish, and Russian. So far he has lived in eight countries.

In March 2020, Tokieda was interviewed on The Joy of X, Steven Strogatz's podcast for Quanta Magazine.

Selected publications

References

External links

 at the University of Cambridge
"Toy inspires new spin on Earth's magnetic field", New Scientist

Living people
1968 births
Japanese expatriates in the United States
Japanese expatriates in the United Kingdom
Alumni of the University of Oxford
Princeton University alumni
Sophia University alumni
21st-century Japanese mathematicians
Mathematical physicists
Geometers
Scientists from Tokyo
20th-century Japanese mathematicians